Capoeta kosswigi, also known as the Van scraper or Van barb, is a species of cyprinid fish living in Turkey, in the Van Lake basin.  It is however likely (but not finally clear) that this is the same fish as Capoeta damascina, and the name is thus just a synonym.

References 

Kosswigi
Endemic fauna of Turkey
Fish of Turkey
Freshwater fish
Fish described in 1969